The following highways are numbered 84.

International
 Asian Highway 84
 European route E84

Australia
 Golden Highway
 Wills Developmental Road (Queensland)

Iran
 Road 84

Korea, South
Gukjido 84

New Zealand
  New Zealand State Highway 84

United States
 Interstate 84 (Oregon–Utah)
 Interstate 84 (Pennsylvania–Massachusetts)
 U.S. Route 84
 Arizona State Route 84
 Arizona State Route 84A
 Arkansas Highway 84
 California State Route 84
Colorado State Highway 84 (1923-1968) (former)
 Florida State Road 84
 Georgia State Route 84
 Illinois Route 84
 K-84 (Kansas highway)
 Kentucky Route 84
 Maryland Route 84
 M-84 (Michigan highway)
 Minnesota State Highway 84
 County Road 84 (Anoka County, Minnesota)
 Missouri Route 84
 Montana Highway 84
 Nebraska Highway 84
 Nevada State Route 84 (former)
 New Hampshire Route 84
 New Jersey Route 84
 County Route 84 (Bergen County, New Jersey)
 New York State Route 84 (former)
 County Route 84 (Broome County, New York)
 County Route 84 (Chautauqua County, New York)
 County Route 84 (Chemung County, New York)
 County Route 84 (Dutchess County, New York)
 County Route 84 (Erie County, New York)
 County Route 84 (Essex County, New York)
 County Route 84 (Greene County, New York)
 County Route 84 (Jefferson County, New York)
 County Route 84 (Livingston County, New York)
 County Route 84 (Madison County, New York)
 County Route 84 (Monroe County, New York)
 County Route 84 (Onondaga County, New York)
 County Route 84 (Rensselaer County, New York)
 County Route 84 (Rockland County, New York)
 County Route 84 (Schenectady County, New York)
 County Route 84 (Suffolk County, New York)
 North Carolina Highway 84
 Ohio State Route 84
 Oklahoma State Highway 84
 Pennsylvania Route 84 (former)
 Rhode Island Route 84 (former)
 Tennessee State Route 84
 Texas State Highway 84 (former)
 Texas State Highway Loop 84
 Texas State Highway Spur 84 (former)
 Farm to Market Road 84
Urban Road 84 (former)
 Utah State Route 84 (former)
 Virginia State Route 84
 West Virginia Route 84
 Wisconsin Highway 84 (former)

See also
A84